Jazbina is a dispersed settlement in the hills east of Črna na Koroškem in the Carinthia region in northern Slovenia.

There is a church in the settlement, built on the peak of Mount St. Ursula at an elevation of 1,699 m. It is dedicated to Saint Ursula and belongs to the Parish of Stari Trg. It is a pilgrimage church that started being built around 1570, but was only completed in the early 17th century and was dedicated in 1602. The belfry dates to 1614. It has a triple nave divided by Gothic arcades and five altars.

References

External links
Jazbina on Geopedia

Populated places in the Municipality of Črna na Koroškem